Vojislav Korać (1924–2010) was a Yugoslav and Serbian historian and academic. An ethnic Serb, he was born in Debelo Brdo in Udbina, Kingdom of Yugoslavia (now Croatia).

Selected works

References

1924 births
2010 deaths
20th-century Serbian historians
Architecture in Serbia
Serbian academics
Serbs of Croatia
People from Udbina